The Buckener Au is a headstream of the Bünzau in the north German state of Schleswig-Holstein.
The Buckener Au rises southwest of Hohenwestedt. Near Innien it unites with the Fuhlenau forming the Bünzau.

Heck cattle are grazed in the valley of the Au near Aukrug-Homfeld.

See also

List of rivers of Schleswig-Holstein

Rivers of Schleswig-Holstein
Rendsburg-Eckernförde
Aukrug
Rivers of Germany